"Take It from Me" is the debut single of Australian girl group Girlfriend, released in April 1992 from the group's debut studio album, Make It Come True. The song peaked at number one in Australia, becoming the act's only major chart success in their career. The song was also released in New Zealand and the United Kingdom, charting within the top 50 in both countries.

Track listing

Charts

Weekly charts

Year-end charts

Certifications

Release history

See also
 List of number-one singles in Australia during the 1990s

References

1992 debut singles
1992 songs
Arista Records singles
Bertelsmann Music Group singles
Girlfriend (band) songs
Number-one singles in Australia
RCA Records singles
Songs written by Rick Price